The Best of Rascal Flatts Live is a live album by American country music group Rascal Flatts. It was released on November 8, 2011 via Hollywood Records. The album includes the number one singles "Bless the Broken Road," "Stand," "These Days" and "What Hurts the Most." Also included are covers of Boston's "Foreplay/Long Time" and The Edgar Winter Group's "Free Ride."

Track listing

Chart performance

References

2011 live albums
Rascal Flatts albums
Hollywood Records live albums